Íñigo López de Mendoza y Mendoza (1512 – Mondéjar, April 21, 1580), was a Spanish noble, military, diplomat and politician in the service of King  Philip II of Spain.

Biography
He inherited from his father Luis Hurtado de Mendoza y Pacheco the titles of 4th Count of Tendilla and 3rd Marquis of Mondejar. He became also 3rd and last Captain General of Granada. His mother was Catalina de Mendoza, daughter of the Count of Monteagudo.  
Íñigo married María de Mendoza, daughter of the very influential Íñigo López de Mendoza, 4th Duke of the Infantado.

In 1555, he became commander of the Spanish land and sea in the relief of the Turkish siege of Oran and Bugía. In 1560, he was Spanish Ambassador in Rome. He led the Spanish troops during the early stages of the Morisco Revolt together with Luis Fajardo, 2nd Marquis of los Vélez. The American historian Henry Charles Lea wrote of Mondéjar's "short but brilliant campaign... Through heavy snows and intense cold and over almost inaccessible mountains he fought battle after battle, giving the enemy no respite and following up every advantage gained. The Moriscos speedily lost heart and sought terms of surrender… By the middle of February [1569] the rebellion was practically suppressed." Despite these successes, Mondejar was replaced in 1570 by Juan de Austria. After the suppression of the rebellion, he became viceroy of Valencia in 1572, and Viceroy of Naples in 1575.

He had 9 sons and two daughters, amongst whom
 Luis Hurtado (1543–1604), his successor.
 Francisco López de Mendoza y Mendoza, (1547-1623), Admiral of Aragon
 Juan Hurtado (1555–1624), married Ana de Mendoza y Enríquez de Cabrera, 6th Duchess of the Infantado
 Elvira (1565), married Pedro Álvarez de Toledo, 5th Marquis of Villafranca.

References

External links
Los Mendoza (in Spanish)
GeneAll.net

Ambassadors of Spain to the Holy See
Viceroys of Naples
Viceroys of Valencia
Counts of Spain
Marquesses of Spain
1512 births
1580 deaths
University of Salamanca alumni
Academic staff of the University of Salamanca